The Mercedes Benz M136 Engine was a  otto-cycle (gasoline) inline-four engine introduced by Mercedes-Benz in 1935 for its new W136 sedan. It was initially used in the W136 170 V.

See also
 Mercedes-Benz M121 engine
 List of Mercedes-Benz engines

References 

M136